China International Center is a 62-storey,  skyscraper completed in 2007 in Guangzhou, China.

See also
 List of tallest buildings in the world

References

Skyscraper office buildings in Guangzhou
Buildings and structures completed in 2007
Yuexiu District